Allegheny Electric Cooperative is an electric generation and transmission cooperative that generates electricity for 14 member electric cooperatives in the states of Pennsylvania and New Jersey in the United States. The cooperative, which was founded in 1946, is based in Harrisburg, Pennsylvania.

About
Allegheny Electric Cooperative is an electric generation and transmission cooperative founded in 1946 that provides wholesale power to 14 electric cooperatives located in the states of Pennsylvania and New Jersey. Allegheny Electric Cooperative generates its electricity from various sources, with renewable energy sources such as nuclear and hydroelectric power accounting for about 65 percent of the energy supply. The cooperative owns a 10 percent stake in the Susquehanna Steam Electric Station, a 2,600 MW, two-unit nuclear power plant in Luzerne County, Pennsylvania, with Talen Energy owning the remaining 90 percent and operating the power plant. Allegheny Electric Cooperative operates the Raystown Hydroelectric Project and William F. Matson Generating Station, a 21 MW, two-unit hydroelectric project located at the Raystown Dam in Huntingdon County, Pennsylvania.

Members
Allegheny Electric Cooperative is composed of 14 member electric cooperatives in Pennsylvania and New Jersey, who are all members of the Pennsylvania Rural Electric Association:
Adams Electric Cooperative
Bedford Rural Electric Cooperative
Central Electric Cooperative
Claverack Rural Electric Cooperative
New Enterprise Rural Electric Cooperative
Northwestern Rural Electric Cooperative
REA Energy Cooperative
Somerset Rural Electric Cooperative
Sullivan County Rural Electric Cooperative
Sussex Rural Electric Cooperative
Tri-County Rural Electric Cooperative
United Electric Cooperative
Valley Rural Electric Cooperative
Warren Electric Cooperative

References

External links
Allegheny Electric Cooperative

Electric generation and transmission cooperatives in the United States
Companies based in Harrisburg, Pennsylvania
Energy companies established in 1946